A nazim is the coordinator of a city or town in Pakistan.

Nazim or variant spellings may also refer to:

Nazim (given name), including a list of people with the given name
Nazim (surname), including a list of people with the surname

See also
Nazimabad, a suburb of Karachi, Sindh, Pakistan
Nizam of Hyderabad, monarch of the Hyderabad State